Colossal Youth (literally "Youth on the March") is a 2006 docufiction feature film directed by Portuguese director Pedro Costa. It was third feature by Costa set in Lisbon's Fontainhas neighborhood (after Ossos and In Vanda's Room), and the first to feature the recurring character Ventura.

Colossal Youth was shot on DV in long, static takes; it also mixes documentary and fiction storytelling. The film is a meditation on the aftermath of the Carnation Revolution and its consequences for Portugal's poverty-stricken Cape Verdean immigrants. It was part of the Official Competition at the 2006 Cannes Film Festival.

Plot
"Many of the lost souls of Ossos and In Vanda’s Room return in the spectral landscape of Colossal Youth,.... What results is a form of ghost story, a tale of derelict, dispossessed people living in the past and present at the same time..."

The film opens with a shot of a doorway in a run-down neighborhood. Furniture comes crashing down on the pavement from a second-floor window, followed by a close shot of a woman holding a knife and ranting.  As in other parts of the movie, relationships of time and space between shots are not clear.  It is not certain that the woman was the one throwing out the furniture or that the man she is complaining about is Ventura, the 75-year-old main character.   (Like most of the film's other characters, Ventura is played by a nonprofessional.)  Much of the film is taken up with Ventura's visits to other people in the area, many of whom he refers to as his "children."  Sometimes in return, they refer to him as "Papa." At other times, Ventura is shown in his new, bright but almost barren, government-provided apartment, which contrasts sharply with the squalid and dark tenements that are due to be destroyed. Those rooms are often filmed in a high-contrast style that makes them strangely beautiful.

Ventura is asked to write a love letter by a fellow Cape Verdean (Lento) for his wife. Ventura's recitation of the letter becomes a recurring theme in the film. At times in the film, there are also allusions to past lives in the Cape Verde Islands and to Portugal's political past, the title "Youth on the March" being especially ironic.

Cast 

 Ventura 
 Vanda Duarte 
 Paula Barrulas 
 Cila Cardoso 
 Silva 'Nana' Alexandre 
 Alberto 'Lento' Barros as Lento
 Beatriz Duarte 
 Paulo Nunes 
 Gustavo Sumpta 
 António Semedo 
 José Maria Pina
 Isabel Cardoso as Clotilde

Credits 

 Director: Pedro Costa 
 Producer: Francisco Villa-Lobos 
 Cinematography: Pedro Costa, Leonardo Simões 
 Editing: Pedro Marques 
 Co-producer: Philippe Avril, Andres Pfaeffli / Elda Guidinetti 
 Sound: Olivier Blanc 
 Sound: Vasco Pedroso, Jean-Pierre Laforce

Reception 
When the film premiered at the 2006 Cannes Film Festival, many in the audience walked out, apparently frustrated by the film's long, static shots, long stretches of silence, and lack of narrative clarity.  Roger Ebert reported that he did not go to see the film because the Time magazine critic Richard Corliss had warned him that his wife had gone and "walked out after an hour because the movie made her feel like rats were fighting in her skull.”  Other critics, however, have given the film serious consideration, comparing it to films by other directors notable for their slow and spare styes, including Yasujiro Ozu, Robert Bresson, and the team of Jean-Marie Straub and Danièle Huillet (one of Costa's mentors).

In a New York Times review, Manohla Dargis called Colossal Youth one of the most "misunderstood" films at Cannes, remarking, "Beautifully photographed, this elliptical, sometime confounding, often mysterious and wholly beguiling mixture of fiction and nonfiction looks and sounds as if it were made on another planet. And, in some respects, it was." In 2007, Slant magazine critic Fernando F. Croce wrote that it is "as  a compassionate and unmistakably spiritual document . . . that Colossal Youth leaves its deepest marks . . . and an intimidating aesthetic experiment becomes directly, colossally affecting."  And in a 2008 review, critic David Balfour describes the film as "a truly remarkable work from a man of unique vision," adding "It will divide those see it, even those who stay with it. The sense of dislocated in time and place is unique. The effect of the film is cumulative."

Home video 
This film, together with Ossos (1997) and In Vanda's Room (2000), is released by the Criterion Collection in a box set Letters from Fontainhas: Three Films by Pedro Costa.

See also
 List of docufiction films
 Ethnofiction

References

External links

2008 interview with Pedro Costa by Kenichi Eguchi, in Japan.
Podcast with Pedro Costa (on the Letters from Fontainhas Criterion DVD set, 2010) at GreenCine Daily
Pedro Costa’s Fontainhas Trilogy: Rooms for the Living and the Dead an essay by Cyril Neyrat at the Criterion Collection

Portuguese drama films
2000s Portuguese-language films
Ethnofiction films
Films about immigration
Films about race and ethnicity
2006 films
2006 drama films
Films directed by Pedro Costa